QQQQ may refer to:

 The former ticker symbol for Invesco QQQ Trust, an exchange-traded fund based on the NASDAQ-100 stock index
 The Morse code for unknown attacker, use in conjunction with SOS
 The poker hand "Village People", composed of four queens, see List of playing-card nicknames

See also
 QQQ (disambiguation)
 QQ (disambiguation)
 Q (disambiguation)